Haven Christopher Moses (born July 27, 1946) is an American former professional football player who was a wide receiver for 14 seasons in the American Football League (AFL) and National Football League (NFL). 

Moses initially played college football at Los Angeles Harbor College, then transferred to San Diego State University under head coach

Pro football
Moses was selected ninth overall in the 1968 NFL/AFL Draft by the Buffalo Bills of the AFL. During his fifth season with the Bills in 1972, he was traded in mid-October to the Denver Broncos for wide receiver  Moses made the AFL All-Star Game in 1969 and the NFL Pro Bowl in 1973. He was a key member of the 1977 team, scoring two touchdowns in the AFC title game on New Year's Day to advance to 

He is on the "Ring of Fame" in Empower Field at Mile High, and was a 1986 inductee to the Colorado Sports Hall of Fame.

's NFL off-season, Haven Moses held at least 2 Broncos franchise records, including:
 Yds/Rec: career (18.05)
 Receiving TDs: playoff game (2 on 1978-01-01 OAK)

After football
In his last four years as a player, in the offseason he worked for Samsonite, the international luggage company headquartered 

After the 1981 season, Moses retired from the NFL in March at age 35 and went to work for Adolph Coors Company in the community affairs   He spent 15 years with Coors, seven with the Archdiocese of Denver, and five with the Denver Health Foundation.

See also
 List of American Football League players

References

External links
 

1946 births
Living people
American football wide receivers
Buffalo Bills players
Denver Broncos players
Los Angeles Harbor Seahawks football players
San Diego State Aztecs football players
American Conference Pro Bowl players
American Football League All-Star players
Players of American football from Los Angeles
American Football League players